Adolf Rosenberger (Born: 8 April 1900 in Pforzheim, Germany. Died: 6 December 1967 in Los Angeles, California, USA) was a successful Jewish businessman and founder of the Porsche company. 

A race driver, he raced Mercedes and Benz cars in the 1920s. His successes and records included wins at Avus, Stuttgart Solitude in 1924 and 1925, the Kasseler Herkules Hillclimb and the Klausenpassrennen. At the 1926 German Grand Prix, Rosenberger was involved in one of the numerous accidents in treacherous conditions. He survived a crash into the timekeepers' box, which killed its three occupants.

Following the Aryanization and after the Holocaust, Rosenberger was deprived of his stake-holdings and position in the Porsche company.

Biography
In 1931, he founded the Porsche GmbH together with Ferdinand Porsche and Dr. Anton Piëch. With Rosenberger's financial backing, Dr. Ferdinand Porsche and Dr. Anton Piëch started the company with some former co-workers including chief designer Karl Rabe. Rosenberger was also instrumental in the creation of the Auto Union concern, being credited with influencing Porsche's choice of a mid-engined design for the Auto Union racing cars.

Despite Rosenberger's contribution to the development of German automobiles and German auto racing, when Hitler came to power in Germany, Rosenberger, a Jew, was arrested for "Rassenschande" (racial crimes), and imprisoned at KZ Schloss Kislau near Karlsruhe. He was released, by the goodwill of a colleague, Hans Baron Veyder Mahlberg who bribed Gestapo agents, but he was forced to leave Germany immediately. He emigrated to France, and later to Great Britain, representing Porsche GmbH in both of those countries. He immigrated to the United States in 1939 and in 1944 he became a US-citizen under the name of Alan Arthur Robert. He moved to California, where he was active in motorsports and the automobile business. He died in Los Angeles, California, in 1967.

During the Nazi era, the role in the auto history of many Jews, like Adolf Rosenberger, along with Josef Ganz, Siegfried Marcus, and Edmund Rumpler was written out of history.

External links
 Grand Prix Insider: 12 December

References

Businesspeople from Baden-Württemberg
German founders of automobile manufacturers
20th-century American Jews
German emigrants to the United States
1900 births
1967 deaths
20th-century American businesspeople
Jewish emigrants from Nazi Germany to the United Kingdom
People from Pforzheim
Porsche people
Automotive businesspeople